Dannenberg is a surname. Notable people with the surname include:

Alice Dannenberg, (1861 – 1948), Russian-born French painter 
Andrew Jess Dannenberg (born 1956), American physician
Konrad Dannenberg, German-American engineer
Martin Dannenberg (1915–2010), American insurance executive
Peter A Dannenberg, Russian general

See also
Danneberg